Ferrissia tenuis is a species of a freshwater snail or limpet, an aquatic  gastropod in the family Planorbidae.

Distribution 
This species is found in India.

Ecology
The population trend of this species is unknown.

Ferrissia tenuis is considered as a suspected host of Schistosoma haematobium in India.

References

Planorbidae
Gastropods described in 1862